The grass goby (Zosterisessor ophiocephalus) is a species of goby native to the Mediterranean Sea, the Sea of Azov and the Black Sea.  It is currently the only known member of its genus.

Characteristics
The head crown, nape, throat, belly, and bases of the pectoral fins are covered by cycloid scales and the gill covers are naked. The abdominal sucker has no blades and does not reach the anus. The mandibulae are protrusive, and the skin soft, with mucus. Their coloration is green-brown, patterned with merging brown spots. The cheeks have round light spots. The dorsal, caudal, and pectoral fins have longitudinal brown stripes on a light background; the anal and abdominal suckers are dark.

Range

Widespread in coastal waters of all seas of the Mediterranean basin, they are especially numerous in the northern Adriatic Sea, Venetian Lagoon, and Sète Lagoon (France) and in the Black Sea near all coasts, especially in lagoons and estuaries of the north-west, Varna and Burgas Bays, Sea of Azov, and Sivash.

Feeding
Until age two, grass gobies feed only on crustaceans, after which they start to eat fish. In Tuzly Lagoons, they first feed on gammarids Gammarus lacustris (94%), and Idotea balthica (6%) followed by fish like the big-scale sand smelt (30%) and gobies (36%). Shrimp Palaemon adspersus also play an important role.

Parasites
About 27 parasite species are known from the grass goby near the Crimean coasts. The acanthocephalans Acanthocephaloides propinquus are most numerous. In the northwestern Black Sea, this fish has 13 parasite species. Except for the aforementioned A. propinquus, another acanthocephalan, Telosentis exiguus, is very numerous. Both are Mediterranean immigrants as is their host, the grass goby. Also, the Ponto-Caspian cestodes Proteocephalus gobiorum and monogeneans Gyrodactylus proterorhini were very numerous. In the Budaki Lagoon, the grass goby is a host of larvae of epizootic nematode Streptocara crassicauda.

Importance

The grass goby is a dietary item for some commercial fishes, such as the toad goby. In the Sea of Azov, it is used for food by the harbour porpoise.

The grass goby is a commercial fish in the Black Sea and the Sea of Azov, the Molochnyi Estuary, Tuzly Lagoons, and in the Sivash.

References

grass goby
Fish of the Adriatic Sea
Fish of the Mediterranean Sea
Fish of the Black Sea
Fish of Europe
grass goby
Taxobox binomials not recognized by IUCN